is a Japanese programming block on Fuji TV dedicated to anime and broadcast every Wednesday late night/Thursday morning from 00:55 to 1:25.

History
The block was announced on March 8, 2018, and premiered on October 18, 2018, with its first anime Ingress: The Animation. According to +Ultra and Noitamina producer Mori Akitoshi from Fuji TV, the programming block is kind of a brother to the Noitamina block due to being a unique vision of an anime block much like it. In the announcement, it was said that the block was made due to the diversification of viewing media with anime being shared around the world via streaming services, which is why the block is based on the concept of spreading anime culture overseas with high-quality animation for the world.

Crunchyroll co-productions
On September 23, 2021, Crunchyroll, Slow Curve, and Fuji TV announced the beginning of a partnership to co-produce new anime projects, with the first set to launch in April 2022. The titles will air in Japan exclusively on +Ultra, and on Crunchyroll worldwide outside of Asia. Among the first projects announced were Estab-Life from Gorō Taniguchi and an untitled project from Polygon Pictures and Tsutomu Nihei. Crunchyroll and Fuji TV co-produced Muv-Luv Alternative together, ahead of the announcement of the partnership.

Titles

See also
 Other Fuji TV anime blocks
 Blue Lynx, Fuji TV's yaoi (boys' love) anime label
 Noitamina, another anime block that airs on Thursday nights.
 Animeism, a block that airs on Friday nights on MBS.
 , a block that airs on Thursday nights on TBS.
 , a block that airs on Tuesday nights on ntv.
 , a block that airs on Saturday nights on TV Asahi.

References

External links 
  
 Fuji Creative Corporation website 
 

2018 Japanese television series debuts
Anime television
Fuji TV